Darwin's leaf-toed gecko (Phyllodactylus darwini) is a species of lizard in the family Phyllodactylidae. The species is endemic to San Cristóbal Island in the Galapagos.

Etymology
The specific name, darwini, is in honor of English naturalist Charles Darwin, author of On the Origin of Species.

Habitat
The preferred natural habitat of P. darwini is shrubland.

Reproduction
P. darwini is oviparous.

References

Further reading
Rösler H (2000). "Kommentierte Liste der rezent, subrezent, und fossil bekannten Geckotaxa (Reptilia: Gekkonomorpha)". Gekkota 28: 28–153. (Phyllodactylus darwini, p. 104). (in German).
Taylor EH (1942). "Some Geckoes of the Genus Phyllodactylus ". University of Kansas Science Bulletin 28 (6): 91–112. (Phyllodactylus darwini, new species p. 104–108, Figures 4A–4D).
Torres-Carvajal O, Rodríguez-Guerra A, Chaves JA (2016). "Present diversity of Galápagos leaf-toed geckos (Phyllodactylidae: Phyllodactylus) stems from three independent colonization events". Molecular Phylogenetics and Evolution 103: 1–5.

Phyllodactylus
Endemic reptiles of the Galápagos Islands
Reptiles of Ecuador
Reptiles described in 1942
Taxa named by Edward Harrison Taylor